Jamie Muir (born February 2, 1941) is a Canadian educator and politician. He represented the electoral district of Truro-Bible Hill in the Nova Scotia House of Assembly from 1998 to 2009. He was a member of the Progressive Conservative Party of Nova Scotia.

Background

Born in 1941 at Truro, Nova Scotia, Muir graduated from Dalhousie University with a Bachelor of Arts and Bachelor of Education degree before completing his Master's and Doctorate degrees in education at the University of Virginia.

In 1964, he married Mary Jean Cox. They have four children.

Employment history

Muir taught as a Frontier College instructor and a high school teacher in Truro before serving as Director of Inspection Services in the Nova Scotia Department of Education. He also served as inspector of schools in Cumberland, Colchester and Hants counties.

He has taught at the post-secondary level, lecturing at University of Prince Edward Island, serving as assistant professor at Memorial University of Newfoundland, senior research associate at the Atlantic Institute of Education, principal of the Nova Scotia Teachers College from 1989 to 1994 and as a faculty member in the education department at St. Francis Xavier University.

Political career

Muir entered provincial politics in the 1998 election, defeating former Liberal cabinet minister Eleanor Norrie in the Truro-Bible Hill riding. He was re-elected in the 1999 election. In August 1999, Muir was appointed to the Executive Council of Nova Scotia as Minister of Health. On December 19, 2002, Muir was moved to Attorney General and Minister of Justice.

In the 2003 election, Muir was re-elected by over 1500 votes. On August 15, 2003, Muir was moved to Minister of Education in a post-election cabinet shuffle. He retained the education portfolio when Rodney MacDonald took over as premier in February 2006.

Muir was re-elected in 2006. On June 26, 2006, MacDonald shuffled his cabinet, moving Muir to Minister of Service Nova Scotia and Municipal Relations. In October 2007, Muir was given an additional role in cabinet as chair of the Treasury and Policy Board. Muir announced on December 29, 2008, that he would not reoffer in the next election, and was shuffled out of cabinet on January 7, 2009. He returned to cabinet on March 10, 2009, taking over as Minister of Finance and Minister of Aboriginal Affairs, following the death of Michael Baker.

References

1941 births
Canadian people of Scottish descent
Dalhousie University alumni
Living people
Members of the Executive Council of Nova Scotia
Nova Scotia Ministers of Health
Academic staff of Nova Scotia Teachers College
People from Truro, Nova Scotia
Progressive Conservative Association of Nova Scotia MLAs
Academic staff of St. Francis Xavier University
Curry School of Education alumni
21st-century Canadian politicians
Finance ministers of Nova Scotia